WolfBytes Radio is a dance radio station broadcasting on WKNC HD-3, Raleigh-Durham, Cary, and Chapel Hill, North Carolina in the Raleigh-Durham radio market.  The station is run by the North Carolina State University Office of Information Technology and also streams on TuneIn Radio, Apple Radio, Online Radio Box.
Broadcasting with an effective radiated power of 25,000 watts, its signal covers much of the Research Triangle and outlying areas. The station employs student DJs and is managed by full-time staff, broadcasting  from its studios in the West Dunn Building on NC State's campus.

Programming
WolfBytes Radio is hit-driven dance radio and CHR, consisting of current and recent dance and electronic music.  The station has an interactive playlist that lists the songs in the order played as well as a weekly top tracks playlist that is reported to Spins Tracking System.

Specialty programming 

WolfBytes aired a WolfTraxx Top 10 Countdown hosted by Savannah Ford each Friday afternoon at 5PM between 2018-2019.

WolfBytes staff put together a specialty show called WolfBytes Together as a response to the COVID-19 pandemic.  The show aired on April 9, 2020 at 7PM during the first hour of the DjWhtDaHek show and featured the entire WolfBytes staff playing upbeat, positive message songs that listeners could sing along to interspersed with NC State-specific pandemic information and interviews.  The show was re-broadcast the following Saturday at 9PM and then again that Sunday at noon.

WolfBytes began the Happy Hour, an all-request show designed to be uplifting with music from core artists and hosted by Chris Lehman, on Friday, April 24 at noon.

Open Mic

WolfBytes Radio produces an audio podcast called Open Mic where DJs talk with dance artists in the industry.  The podcast is distributed on iTunes, Google Play, TuneIn Podcasts and the station website.  WolfBytes recently completed an Open Mic Week where it released a podcast a day.

Open Mic episodes

DJs
WolfBytes Radio did not use DJs prior to 2016 other than for the year-end countdown shows.  Year-end Countdown show DJs include DJ Kittens, Hal Meeks, Mr. Voice, Traci Fisher, Caitlin Zanga.
2017 DJs
Nick Sinopoli, Drew Blevins, DJ Tif, Adam Obirek, Madison Bell, DjWhtDaHek, Kid Kinetic.  Airchecks are available online.  DjWhtDaHek began producing new music sweeps in late 2016 as the first semi-regular voice on WolfBytes.

2018 DJs

Kid Kinetic, Lulu Batta, Savannah Ford, DjWhtDaHek, Brandon Bouché

2019 DJs

Kid Kinetic, Kayla Glova, Austin Shirron, DjWhtDaHek, Brandon Bouché

2020 DJs

Kid Kinetic, Chris Lehman, Brandon Bouché/Austin Shirron, DjWhtDaHek, DJ Oz

2020 DJs

Chris Lehman, DJ Oz, Nathan Wyatt-Ingram, DjWhtDaHek

2021 DJs

Chris Lehman, DJ Oz, Nathan Wyatt-Ingram, DjWhtDaHek, Cade Cross

2022 DJs

Chris Lehman, Jordan Hatcher, Cade Cross, Sophie Ketron, DjWhtDaHek, Kid Kinetic, Ansley Disher, Hailey Self, DJ Flame, Midnight Maddog

2023 DJs

Sophie Ketron, DjWhtDaHek, Kid Kinetic, Ansley Disher, Hailey Self, DJ Flame, Midnight MaddogJordan Hatcher, Emily Saglia, Collin Lawrence

Weekends

DJ Flan, Rachel Umbach, Austin Shirron, Veronica Heyl, Timmy Trumpet's SINPHONY Radio, Sam Feldt Heartfeldt Radio, Armada Radio, Afrojack's Jacked Radio

Awards

WolfBytes Radio program director BJ Attarian was nominated for a 2021 New Music Award for Program Director of the Year.

History

 September, 2000 - WolfBytes Radio signs on to NC State's cable system on channel 85, airing as accompanying music for WolfBytes Television and as office music for NC State's Communication Technologies.
 August, 2003 - WolfBytes Radio (and Television) move to NC State cable channel 14.
 August, 2007 - WolfBytes Radio begins to move from top 40 to a dance/CHR format.
 2010 - WolfBytes Radio begins year-end countdowns.
 2011 - WolfBytes Radio begins streaming over TuneIn Radio.
 2012 - WolfBytes Radio begins streaming over iTunes Radio.
 2013 - WolfBytes Radio begins reporting to College Music Journal.
 August, 2016 - WolfBytes Radio begins to incorporate DJs outside of the year-end countdowns, beginning with DjWhtDaHek's new music sweeps.
 May, 2017 - First WolfBytes Radio Open Mic.
 August, 2017 - WolfBytes Radio incorporates DJs into all dayparts.
 2017 - WolfBytes begins reporting to Spins Tracking Systems.
 May 3, 2019 - WolfBytes Radio begins broadcasting over WKNC HD-3.

References

External links
 

FM Query Results – Audio Division (FCC) USA
Radio-Locator.com
North Carolina State University
FM Query Results - Fmfool.com

KNC-FM
North Carolina State University
Dance radio stations
Electronic dance music radio stations
Radio stations established in 1966